Timmia parva is a species of nematode in the family Chromadoridae, described in 1952 by Richard William Timm.

References 

Bryopsida
Species described in 1952